Krueppel-like factor 11 is a protein that in humans is encoded by the KLF11 gene.

KLF11 is a mesoderm derived, zinc finger transcription factor in the Krüppel-like factor (KLF) family. It binds to SP1- like GC- rich sequences in epsilon and gamma globin gene promoters inhibiting cellular growth and causing apoptosis. In the regulation of genes, it is involved in cellular inflammation and differentiation, making it an essential factor in early embryonic development. This transcription factor binds to promoters of genes involved in cholesterol, prostaglandin, neurotransmitter, fat, and sugar metabolism, specifically pancreatic beta cell function. Defects in KLF11 affect glucose metabolism, insulin transcription, insulin processing, and insulin secretion which cause type 2 diabetes in adults and maturity-onset diabetes of the young type 7. These types of diabetes are caused by KLF11 interacting with co-repressors in the pancreatic islet beta cells. KLF11 has recently been shown to be involved in endometriosis since it regulated the expression of extracellular matrix genes. Its absence in extracellular matrix genes created a more fibrogenic response by the tissue. This was proved by creating a “knockout” model. The experiment showed that the absence of KLF11 showed higher amounts of fibrosis indicating that it prevents the growth of endometriotic lesions and inhibits pathological scarring.

Interactions 

KLF11 has been shown to interact with SIN3A.

See also 
 Krüppel-like factors
 Maturity onset diabetes of the young

References

Further reading

External links 
 

Transcription factors